Billy B. Van (born William Webster Van de Grift; August 3, 1870 – November 16, 1950) was a prominent American entertainer in the early decades of the 1900s. He was a star, progressively, in minstrel shows, vaudeville, burlesque, the New York stage, and movies.  Under another name, he was a well-known dairy farmer and agriculturist.  And, at the same time he was a manufacturer of soap products.  Late in his career, he reinvented himself as a nationally known motivational speaker, and a Yankee goodwill ambassador.

Biography

Early life
Billy B Van was born William Webster Van de Grift in 1870, in Pottstown, Pennsylvania.  (He sometimes stated it was 1871.) His parents were George W. Van de Grift, and Henrietta. His father was a railroad engineer.  His grandfather was a dairyman from the Netherlands.

Early entertainer years

Van's entertainment career spans some 48 years (1879 to 1927). In many ways it reflects the change in American entertainment.  The arc went from minstrel shows, often in blackface, to vaudeville and burlesque, to the legitimate stage.  And add to this a career in silent motion pictures, both as producer and actor.

The story is told that Van got his start after his family moved to Philadelphia.  In 1879 J.C. Stewart, a well-known manager, advertised for a child to play in H.M.S. Pinafore.  Van auditioned successfully, but Stewart felt that the name was too long, so he changed it to Master Willie Van. Van later changed his acting name to William Van, then Billy Van, and finally to Billy B. Van, because there was another Billy Van.

At age 14 he was in a minstrel troupe in Atlantic City, called Trocadero. He was being paid $10 a day.  By age 20 he is reported playing vaudeville and burlesque with a stock company in Washington, D.C.

Being in the theatre probably did not comport with his parents' goals.  His father got him a job in his teens at the Brill Car Co., where he was reported to have spent his time entertaining the workers.  He did not go far in formal education, saying later that he was a graduate of the school of hard knocks (though much later he was made an honorary member of the Dartmouth College Class of 1906).

Georges Mills, New Hampshire
Van moved to the small village of Georges Mills, New Hampshire, around 1897.  The village, which then had a population in the hundreds, is located on a harbor of Lake Sunapee, a large lake in the western part of the state.  It is said he was diagnosed with tuberculosis while acting in Boston, and a fellow actor extolled Lake Sunapee. He describes himself in his quasi-autobiography, cited below, as poor and living in a barn for months to recuperate.

After returning to the stage, however, he accumulated enough money to begin to buy property in Georges Mills.  This consisted first of considerable area on Prospect Hill, today 360 Prospect Hill, where he had Frank Holmes, a local contractor, build a large stone house and barns with a silo. Here Van had a large herd of registered Guernsey cows.  Van was wearing his Van de Grift agricultural hat here, as explained below.  The barns have seen later use as a summer stock theatre,  stable and for many years an antique furniture barn.

He also established his presence on a large lot right on the harbor, constructing a casino and a playhouse. He had both an indoor and outdoor studio, dressing rooms and accommodations for 75 people.  He named the place Van Casino and took to calling Georges Mills "Van Harbor".

In the summers, probably at a time when the New York stage was less active, he staged plays there.  It is said that he brought up from New York such well-known stars as Ethel Barrymore, Jeanne Eagels, Marie Dressler and Fatty Hires, many of whom he acted with in the winter.  A photo taken in Casino shows a lot of well-known stars.

In 1915 he essayed the filming of several silent movies.  This he did as part of a New York company, Equity Motion Pictures.  Two of these were Zooloo Nightmare and The Lucky Hoodoo. 

Concerted effort in recent years has turned up some his films and the work to find the rest continues.  John Tariot, a historian and restored of silent films, had set up a website devoted to Van's movie career.  He has found Lucky Hoodoo, and another film Van made, Where are the Husbands? as well as others.

In filming these movies, Van used the local folks as bit actors, making some of them go in blackface. One of the actors was a local, Lee Collins, who later had a career as a choreographer on Broadway.

One article said, with some exaggeration, that Van owned all of Georges Mills except the jail.  Another said that the initial thrill of local people with the stars and the technicians and the vehicles wore off.  They disliked the actors "parading around in outlandish costumes and makeup and introducing their large snorting automobiles to the quiet village", not leaving room for the horse and buggies.  An article stated that because of this he was run out of town—moving to nearby Newport, New Hampshire.

Long and varied stage career
In the vaudeville days of his career, Van often performed with the Beaumont Sisters, Rose and Nellie. These were also then well-known vaudeville and variety show performers. For a while he had a company by the name of Billy B. Van and The Beaumont Sisters Co. In 1910 they appeared at the Manhattan Opera House in a variety show; other acts were the Five Juggling Jewels and Dunlap's Educated Horse. In one article it is stated Van had been married to Nellie.

A list of the plays in which Van appeared is available in the International Broadway Database (IBDB). With some notations added, these are:

1903: "The Jersey Lily" (Van was in a burlesque scene with a star described as wearing some stunning frocks)
1905: "The Errand Boy" (he appeared with Rose Beaumont and a large force of chorus girls, The New York Times said)
1907: "Patsy in Politics" (a later article raises the question whether the term 'a patsy' came from this play)
1908: "Little Nemo" (Van was listed as the star; ran for 111 performances)
1917: "Have as Heart" (Van played the lead role of Henry; the book by P.G. Wodehouse, music by Jerome Kern.  Van was criticized as having an instinct to vaudeville tendencies)
1918: The Rainbow Girl
1923: "Adrienne"
1925: "Artists and Models" (Van opened in this, and it ran some 416 performances)
1925: "Gay Paree"
1926 "Sunny Days" (Jeanette MacDonald was the star)
1928: "Sunny Days" (revival)

In some of these Van was the star and in many he was quite popular.  Indeed, at one point he was described as one of the most amusing men on the vaudeville stage.  One of the most popular plays was "Have a Heart".  He sang a song Napoleon, composed by Kern. The soundtrack of Billy V. Van and the Peerless Quartet, 1916, is available on CD collections today; it was a Columbia recording. In addition to acting and singing, Van played the banjo, and there are recordings of his playing various pieces on purchasable CDs.

A most interesting part of Van's stage career is his association with the former heavyweight champion, James J. Corbett (Gentleman Jim).  They appeared together in a sketch called "Spirited Travesty" in 1922 as part of a variety show.  Together they toured the country and also went to Europe for eight weeks.

Van appeared with many actors and actresses remembered until this day, including Jeanette MacDonald, Fatty Arbuckle, Hal Roach, and Harold Lloyd.  He is mentioned in the biographies of many with whom he was associated, including MacDonald, Wodehouse, and Corbett.  The theatres of this day were in the area of Fourteenth St., and term Broadway shows came only after his time.  Van also went on the road with many of these shows.  He and the Beaumont Sisters played at the Orpheum in Los Angeles in 1915.

Elbert Hubbard, himself somewhat forgotten today, was enthusiastic about Van.  In 1913 in his Philistine journal, he describes Van as he "frivols and frolics all day long, on and off the stage." He added,  "He is the eternal rube who has lifted rubism to the realm of art."

Van was also the founder of The Equity Motion Picture Company which may have been an extension of the Van Harbor Casino Movie Co.  What became of this company has several explanations. One is that it moved to Hollywood as part of the whole movement of the industry there.  Another is that it merged with Metro-Goldwyn Mayer, or at least one of the three entities. And a third is that Van played a role in the establishment of MGM, which unless established seems like an exaggeration.

Van appeared in at least one movie, still in the silent area, Beauty Shop, in 1922, based on a 1914 musical.  He played the role of Sobini. Jim Corbett also appeared in the 70 minute film, which was about a beauty doctor.

Van also performed off the stage in New York and elsewhere.  The New York Times reported that in 1925 he appeared with Al Jolson, Harry Hirshfeld, and others whose names are still recalled today at the New York Friars' Club for the first anniversary celebration of the [Gimbel Brothers] radio station, WGBS. The same year he was one of the entertainers in a vaudeville show by William Morris at the Royal Arch Masons Hall.  Somewhat lower on the scale, he appeared with many other well-known names at a contest judging goats in Central Park in 1934, as part of a Bock Beer festival.  Van also had for a period of time a half-hour radio show on the CBS network.

Van retired from the stage in 1927, one article implying it was due to health. He seems to have returned only once, in a Mae West show in 1949, Diamond Lil.

Negative press
In 1916 a New York Times  article reported that he had been taken to Bellevue Hospital in Manhattan suffering from apoplexy, an old name for stroke. He was reported in serious condition. Police had been called to a hotel room on West 44th Street, where he had been staying related to his work on his Equity Motion Picture Co., and he lived at Van Harbor, New Hampshire. The police found an unregistered gun in his room and he was being held technically as a prisoner at Bellevue.

The Times printed a clarification on July 10, 1916, that it was minstrel "Billy Van" who was taken to Bellevue, not Billy B. Van, who was performing at the Brighton Theatre on the night in question.

A nastier article was that Van was being sued for breach of promise to marry by Miss Ray Myers, of Long Island City, an actress. The story in The New York Times in 1925 said that the suit, seeking $125,000 in damages, was coming to trial in a Queens, New York court.  The suit claimed that instead of keeping his engagement to marry Ray, he had married Grace Walsh in 1923. The article states he had been married four times before. Myers' attorney stated that he had incriminating letters as evidence, and Van's defense was this was just "a little friendship". The Los Angeles Times later ran a picture of Myers, with the announcement that Van had paid $5000 to settle the claim.

Agricultural career
A major The New York Times article in 1917 is the source of a picture of what might be called the two Vans: Billy B. Van, the New York audience knew as a performer, and William Vandegrift—his birth name—as an expert in dairy farming and other agricultural affairs. In fact, he is called one of the seven best-qualified authorities on dairy management. Since this is a story told to the reporter by Van, there is every possibility of exaggeration.

The article starts with a Nebraska businessman attending a Broadway play in which Van was a star.  He recognizes him as William Vandegrift who had spoken at a Nebraska agricultural school.  He goes backstage and learns that Van has a second career, which he seeks to keep apart. The reporter states that when Van goes on the stage somewhere around the country, he tries to find an agricultural college or society to speak at too.

Van's agricultural credentials traced back to his Dutch ancestors, and also practices his grandfather had which were not accepted at the time but Van was promoting now.  Van could of course draw on his own experience as a dairy farmer in New Hampshire.  The Times article also discusses other experiences of Van including being an advisor on usefulness for dairy purposes of a large lot of land in the San Joaquin Valley.

The Times article also contains a long discussion of a plan Van had of opening up retail butter stores in New York and elsewhere.  It seems that he had invented a new method to make butter quickly and sell it at stores. His first store was planned to be opened soon in a wealthy section of Manhattan.  People could bring in their own milk and leave with butter or cheese.  There is no evidence that this venture ever got off the ground, and possibly Van was playing the reporter for a fool.

Life in Newport, New Hampshire
Van moved to Newport, New Hampshire around 1915, then a town with about a 4000 population. Newport was and is a small town in the western third of the state, with a long history. He built a large home and also barns and other outbuildings, on a site behind what is now the Hilltop Hotel on the north side of current Route 11. He bought the Cutting Farm, which was on the south side of Route 11, which he used as a pasture.

Van married Grace Walsh in 1922.  Grace, who was from Syracuse, had a career on the stage, which is no doubt where Van met her.  She is listed as being in five performances, running from The Rich Mr. Hoggenheimer in 1906 to Virginia in 1927.  She played Rio Rita Girl in Tin Pan Alley.  Grace lived in Newport, with Van doing a lot of traveling, and one article refers to an unhappy marriage with a period of discontent.  They had three children, about whom there is more below.

Van integrated himself into Newport life over the years he lived there.  He became a booster of Newport and (more broadly) New England.  He is widely credited as coining the nickname "The Sunshine City" for the town, which it still uses, though that term may not refer, at least accurately, to the weather.  And he was often referred to as the honorary mayor of the town (though wrongly sometimes called the actual mayor).  A sketch of Van at the Newport Historical Society refers to him as a common and voluble presence at town meetings.  One article states he had served as a justice of the peace in Newport.

News clips from the time describe efforts of Van to promote the area based upon the fact that the author of "Mary Had a Little Lamb", Sarah Josepha Hale, had lived nearby. Somehow this created controversy, which Van seems to have fueled.  Local clips also show that he started a national group for needy children after World War I called the Children's Sunshine Dinner Club.

The Newport Historical Society has some Van memorabilia. One object is a trunk with his name on it, usable for all of the travel the man took around the country (via train, one assumes).

Business career
The principal business venture of Van was the Pine Tree Products Co., a company which he set up in about 1922.  It was incorporated in New York, but evidently the products were made in New Hampshire.  The chief products were a soap and a bath oil.  One writer said that he had experimented for 15 years until he came up with the formula for this soap, which was based on vegetable oil and was pine flavored. It was said in one article that he sold one million cakes in a year, and in another that it was used in the Palmer House in Chicago.  In addition to the Palmer House, it was used at the upscale Hotel Fontenelle in Omaha, Nebraska.  The Fontenelle was the flagship hotel of Gene Eppley's Eppley Hotel Company.  The soap was also used at the twenty plus other hotels in the Eppley chain.  Each of the small hotel bars of Pine Tree soap contained a coupon to send along with one dollar to Pine Tree Products in Newport, New Hampshire for eight large bars of "the best cake of soap in the world." (source: Pine Tree soap bar in its wrapper from the Hotel Fontenelle.)

Pine Tree products seems not to have succeeded, and Van is said to have been out of that company in the early 1940s. Then in 1949, the last year of his life, he started a new soap company, Vanpine.

Speaking career and later life
Van may have retired from an active stage in the career in 1927, but he took on another phase of his life as frenetic as his earlier life.  Undoubtedly this aspect of his life began earlier but it became a full-time occupation after 1927, in part one guesses fueled by ego and in part by earning a living.  And when the great depression started, he adapted to its problems and solutions.

The first focus of his talks would be described in today's terms as a motivational speaker.  He is reported to be in demand as a speaker all over the country.  He spoke at the Roosevelt Hotel in New York to the Sales Executive Club.  According to a newspaper writeup, he proposed to set up a Yankee Union. In another talk to the club, in 1937, he is described as a member of the New England Council.  He gave examples of companies which had adapted to the times; one had gone from making bobbins to lollipop sticks.

The New York Times reported that in 1931 he spoke in Washington to the Association of National Advertisers.  He recommended that his audience read Robinson Crusoe to learn how to adapt to the bad times, and be on the lookout for a "Friday" to help out. Other clips show Van speaking at the Hotel DeSoto in St. Louis at a meeting of the Direct Mail Advertising Association, and in Houston.

The second focus of his talks was self-styled as "Yankee Goodwill Ambassador". Van is said to have been friends with Calvin Coolidge and Woodrow Wilson. And in 1937 he was described as engaged as a "sales educationalist".

Van perhaps obtained some insights for his motivational talks by a job he had for a period of time during World War II, at the Fellows Gear Shaper company in Springfield, Vermont.  He was director of Human Relations (a title in advance of its time). He supervised the broadcasting of uplifting programs to the workers.  He later said that this job gave him the ultimate in understanding motivation.

Other activities of Van were the promotion of Wrigley Chewing Gum on the radio; and writing a book Snap Out of It in 1933, which is partially his autobiography.

In 1948, Billy visited the Bob and Ray Show on WHDH Boston.  That appearance can be heard at the Old Time Radio Downloads website.

Death and lasting legacy
Van died in a hospital in Newport on Nov. 16, 1950, age 79, apparently from heart seizure.  Obituaries provided some retrospective views of his career, as seen from a 1950 perspective.  Time magazine unkindly called him a "palavering onetime vaudeville comic" who plugged chewing gum on radio.  The New York Times called him a long-time trouper and lecturer on Yankee philosophy.  They credited him as being instrumental in the formation of MGM. And the Newport newspaper called him one of the most colorful citizens in its long history.

Van was buried in Pine Grove Cemetery in Newport, with the grave marked only by a footstone.  In 2014 a large headstone was erected in his honor, behind the footstone, describing his career. This marked the time of a revival of interest in the career of Van in the Lake Sunapee area. Both the Newport and Sunapee Historical Societies have put on programs about him. Study of Van's papers deposited in the Newport Historical Society led to an award-winning book by Jayna H. Hooper, "Billy B. Van: Newport's Sunshine Peddler" (2016).

Surviving him was his wife, Grace, who appears to have died a few years later. They had three children. Two were girls, Mary Ann (Bundgus, who later was a secretary to Arthur Godfrey) and Bonnie Grace (Harding, who lived in California). They evidently had talent as they appeared as the Van Sisters in summer stock and with the Shubert organization. The Van Sisters reminds one of the Beaumont Sisters, years earlier. The third was a son, William Van, who died in 1970 and had a small metal grave marker next to his father's stone, but now has his name on the back side of the Van headstone. At the time of Van's death, he had one grandchild, Peter Van Harding.

Primary sources
 Helga Ketchen, A Beginning Who's Who of Some Citizens of the Town of Newport, N.H., August 1961
 Mary Peterson, A Collection of New Hampshire Stories, Mountaineer Publishing Co., New London N.H. (1971)
 Rogers Small, As I Recall It (2003), columns by a reporter for the Argus-Champion in Newport
 Van, Billy B. Snap Out of It, (1933), self-published.

References

External links

 

1870 births
1950 deaths
People from Pottstown, Pennsylvania
American people of Dutch descent
Vaudeville performers
American male silent film actors
20th-century American male actors
Articles containing video clips
People from Sunapee, New Hampshire